The Suin Line (Suwon-Incheon) was a metro line of the Seoul Metropolitan Subway serving the Seoul Capital Area.

The original route, abandoned in 1995, was one of the few  narrow-gauge railways in South Korea. Opened by the privately owned Chosen Gyeongdong Railway in 1937, it connected Suwon to Namincheon via Ansan and Siheung; in 1942, it was taken over by another private railway, the Chosen Railway (the largest of colonial Korea's privately owned railway companies). The Chosen Railway owned the line until all railways in Korea were nationalized after 1945. However, since December 28, 2004, the Suin Line is being reconstructed with standard gauge and double tracking as an integral part of the Seoul Metropolitan Subway network and is opening in three phases.

All northbound trains terminated at Incheon, all southbound services terminated at Oido. Express train service served only Oido, Soraepogu, Incheon Nonhyeon, Woninjae, Yeonsu, Inha University, and Incheon.

Trains along the line were 6 cars long. Platforms at stations are built for 8 cars in preparation for the merging of the Bundang Line with the Suin Line, and are prepared for 10 cars when the extension occurs.

Trains run at an interval of 15 minutes throughout the day.

History

2012:
June 30: The rebuilt Suin Line is officially opened from Oido to Songdo.

2014:
December 27: Darwol Station opens as an in-fill station.

2016:
February 27: The line is extended westward from Songdo to Incheon.

2017:
July 10: Express service is launched on the line.

2020:
September 12: The line is extended eastward from Oido to Suwon. The Suin Line and Bundang Line are integrated into Suin–Bundang Line, which connects Incheon and Wangsimni. Trains run from Cheongnyangni station or Wangsimni station to Jukjeon station, Gosaek station, or Incheon station.

Planned for the future
Hagik station is planned to open between Songdo and Inha University in 2020. In addition, a connection line is under consideration at Suwon that will allow KTX trains to run between the Gyeongbu high-speed railway and Incheon Station via the Suin-Bundang Line by 2025.

Stations

Current alignment

Former alignment

Rolling stock
The Suin Line used 18 Korail Class 351000 trains. They were the same as the third generation Class 351000 trains from the Bundang Line, except that they were painted red like the Gyeongui-Jungang Line and Line 1 trains. These trains have since been repainted yellow to match the color of Bundang Line trains; this was done in anticipation of the merging of the Bundang and Suin Lines into the Suin–Bundang Line.

For the former Suin Line, the Korean National Railroad built a narrow gauge steam locomotive, the KNR160 diesel car (also known as the Niigata/Kawasaki Diesel Car), and the KNR18000 passenger car. One KNR160 car (later renumbered KNR9160) and two KNR18000 car are preserved at the railroad museum in nearby Uiwang.

Gallery

See also
Korail
Suryeo Line
Transportation in South Korea

References

 
Seoul Metropolitan Subway lines
Railway lines in South Korea
Railway lines opened in 1937